Ndèye Coumba Mbengue Diakhaté (9 December 1924 – 25 September 2001) was a Senegalese educator and poet who was active in promoting the education of mothers and their children. Her poetry is published in Filles du soleil (Daughters of the Sun, 1980).

Biography
Born in 1924 in Rufisque, Senegal, Mbengue Diakhaté was one of the first schoolteachers to graduate from the Rufisque Normal School. She was an active member of Rufisque's Association pour l'Action sociale des femmes (Women's Social Action Association).

Works 
Her poetry conveys her views on how women are placed in society, for example, when a man tells his sister or mother "Jiguen rek nga!" (After all, you're just a woman). The conflict with the white population comes through in "Ils étaient Blancs, j'étais Noire..." (They were white, I was black). She not only conveys her innermost thoughts through her poetry but reproduces the forms and rhythms of the Serer oral tradition in her French verses.

Death and legacy 
Ndèye Coumba Mbengue Diakhaté died on 25 September 2001 in Dakar.

References

External links
N'dèye Coumba Mbengué Diakhaté in D'Orphée à Prométhée: La poésie africaine au féminin by Angèle Bassolé Ouédraogo (in French)

2001 deaths
People from Rufisque
Senegalese poets
Senegalese women poets
Senegalese schoolteachers
Senegalese women writers
1924 births
20th-century women writers
20th-century poets